General George Ramsay, 9th Earl of Dalhousie,  (23 October 1770 – 21 March 1838), styled Lord Ramsay until 1787, and Baron Dalhousie from 1815, was a Scottish soldier and colonial administrator. He was Governor of Nova Scotia from 1816 to 1820, Governor General of British North America from 1820 to 1828 and later Commander-in-Chief in India. In turn, his son, James Andrew Broun-Ramsay, 1st Marquess of Dalhousie, would later serve as Governor-General of India.

Background and education
Dalhousie was born at Dalhousie Castle, Midlothian, the son of George Ramsay, 8th Earl of Dalhousie, and Elizabeth, daughter of Andrew Glen. He was educated at the Royal High School, Edinburgh, and the University of Edinburgh.

Military career
After his father's death in 1787, Dalhousie joined the British Army in July 1788 by purchasing a cornetcy in the 3rd Dragoons, and was later appointed to the captaincy of an independent company he himself had raised. He joined the 2nd battalion of the 1st Foot in January 1791, and purchased the rank of major in the 2nd Foot in June 1792. He travelled with the regiment to Martinique, as its commander, and succeeded to the lieutenant-colonelcy in August 1794. He was severely wounded in 1795 and returned to Britain. In 1798 he served in the Irish Rebellion, and in 1799 throughout the Flanders campaign. He received the brevet rank of colonel in January 1800, and fought in the later stages of the Egyptian campaign under Ralph Abercromby, capturing Rosetta without a fight and successfully investing the nearby Fort Julien in April 1801. In 1803 he served as a brigadier-general on the staff in Scotland, and was appointed Major-General in April 1805.

During the later stages of the Peninsular War Dalhousie commanded the 7th Division under the Duke of Wellington. Wellington was sometimes critical of his performance, as during the retreat from Burgos, because of his tardy arrival at Vitoria, and for his misinformation about French intentions shortly before the Battle of Roncesvalles.

With Henry Clinton (or Oswald) and William Stewart he displayed insubordination during the retreat from Burgos. Wellington ordered them down a certain road, but they decided it "was too long and too wet and chose another. This brought them to a bridge which was blocked so that they could not cross. Here, eventually, Wellington found them, waiting. What, Wellington was asked, did he say to them? 'Oh by God, it was too serious to say anything.' 'What a situation is mine!’ he complained to London later. 'It is impossible to prevent incapable men from being sent to the army.'".

At Vitoria he was delayed because he "had found difficulty in marching through the broken country", though Thomas Picton arrived early enough and attacked in his stead when the 7th Division failed to appear

He was nevertheless voted the thanks of Parliament for his services at Vitoria where he commanded the Left Center Column, consisting of the 3rd and 7th Divisions. He was appointed lieutenant-general, and colonel of the 13th Foot in 1813. He led his division in the Battle of the Pyrenees where it was lightly engaged, then went home to England in October. After the previous commander was wounded at the Battle of Orthez in February 1814, Dalhousie briefly led the 7th Division again. He occupied the city of Bordeaux and thus missed the final Battle of Toulouse.

William Kemley was said to have saved the life of Ramsay in battle, by holding a flag over his body. In doing so he suffered a wound from a musket ball that left him with a permanent hole in the palm of his hand. His grandson, Peter Gordon Kemley, used to tell how he could put his finger through the palm of his grandfather's hand. For his actions, William Kemley was given a house on the Dalhousie Estate at Brechin Castle, rent-free for life. His daughter, Caroline Kemley, was born under a gun carriage the evening before the Battle of Quatre Bras.  Her mother was one of six wives per regiment permitted to accompany their husbands.

Later career

In 1815 he was created Baron Dalhousie, of Dalhousie Castle in Midlothian, in the Peerage of the United Kingdom, to allow him to sit in the House of Lords by right (until that point he had sat as a Scottish representative peer).

Lieutenant Governor of Nova Scotia

According to the Dictionary of Canadian Biography Ramsay sought a position in colonial administration to pay debts he incurred expanding his estate. He replaced Sir John Coape Sherbrooke as Lieutenant Governor of Nova Scotia in 1816.  He is known to have employed an official draughtsman, John Elliott Woolford, known for many surviving drawings and paintings.

Ramsay created Dalhousie College in Halifax, Nova Scotia, which grew into Dalhousie University.

Governor-General of Canada

He was appointed, Governor General of British North America in 1820 and held that position until 1828.

Commander in Chief of India
Dalhousie was appointed Commander-in-Chief of the Indian Army in 1828. Army headquarters alternated between Calcutta and Simla. India taxed his health, and he resigned in 1832.

Retirement
Dalhousie suffered a "fainting fit" in February 1833. His health continued to deteriorate, and he returned to his estate, in 1834, where his health continued to deteriorate until his death 4 years later.  He went both blind and senile in his final years.

Family
Lord Dalhousie married Christian, daughter of Charles Broun, of Colstoun in East Lothian, Scotland, a lady of gentle extraction and distinguished gifts, in 1805. She was recognised as a "zealous botanist" by leading scientists of her day.

Ramsay and Christian had three sons, the two elder of whom died early. He died at Dalhousie Castle in March 1838, aged 67, and was succeeded by his youngest son, James, who was later created Marquess of Dalhousie. Lady Dalhousie died in January 1839.

Legacy
While serving as Lieutenant-Governor of Nova Scotia he founded Dalhousie University in Halifax, Nova Scotia.  The town of Dalhousie, New Brunswick was named after him when he visited there in 1826, although his diary entry for the day stated that he disapproved of changing the original French and Mi'kmaq location names. The villages of East and West Dalhousie in Nova Scotia are named after him, as are Earltown and Port Dalhousie, which is part of St. Catharines, Ontario, a community in Calgary Alberta, Dalhousie Station and an adjacent square, Dalhousie Square in Montreal.

See also
 List of universities named after people

References

External links
 
 Glover, Michael. The Peninsular War 1807-1814. Penguin, 1974.
 Oman, Charles. Wellington's Army, 1809-1814. Greenhill, (1913) 1993.
 The Royal Military Calendar, Or Army Service and Commission Book, ed. John Philippart. p. 248-249, Vol I of V, 3rd edition, London, 1820.
 Archives of George Ramsay, 9th Earl of Dalhousie (George Ramsay, 9th Earl of Dalhousie fonds, R4950) are held at Library and Archives Canada

British Army generals
British Army commanders of the Napoleonic Wars
British Army personnel of the Peninsular War
British Commanders-in-Chief of India
Cameronians officers
People of the Irish Rebellion of 1798
British Governors of Nova Scotia
Governors of British North America
Scottish educators
Scottish Presbyterians
Scottish representative peers
Dalhousie University
Earls of Dalhousie
Knights Grand Cross of the Order of the Bath
People from Midlothian
People educated at the Royal High School, Edinburgh
Alumni of the University of Edinburgh
1770 births
1838 deaths
Royal Scots officers
Queen's Own Royal West Kent Regiment officers
3rd The King's Own Hussars officers
British Army personnel of the French Revolutionary Wars
George
University and college founders